Malyshkino is a  sparsely populated rural locality (a village) in Posyolok Velikodvorsky, Gus-Khrustalny District, Vladimir Oblast, Russia. The population was 12 as of 2010.

Geography 
Malyshkino is located on the Dandur River, 51 km south of Gus-Khrustalny (the district's administrative centre) by road. Velikodvorsky is the nearest rural locality.

References 

Rural localities in Gus-Khrustalny District